Martin Davidson (born November 7, 1939) is an American film director, producer, screenwriter, television director. After attending the American Academy of Dramatic Arts, he spent four (five counting tours) years as an actor in Off Broadway shows and regional theater. His directorial debut was The Lords of Flatbush starring Sylvester Stallone,  Henry Winkler and Susan Blakely. He won an ACE award for his film Long Gone.

He is married to residential and restaurant designer Sandy Davidson.

Filmography

References

External links
 
 

1939 births
Living people
American Academy of Dramatic Arts alumni
Film producers from New York (state)
American male screenwriters
American male stage actors
American television directors
Film directors from New York City
People from Brooklyn
Screenwriters from New York (state)